Gazania maritima is one of the flowers known as a calendula, native to the Western Cape province, South Africa.

Description
Gazania maritima is a perennial species, with a spreading growth-form (similar to Gazania rigens) and stems that spread and form mats. 

The leaves are usually pinnate, but can also sometimes be whole. 
The upper leaf surface is smooth (glabrous). 
The leaf margins are lined with tiny spines. 

The flowerheads have yellow rays (sometimes orange). 
The petioles are sometimes ciliate. 
The involucre is smooth (glabrous) and campanulate, with an obtuse base (sometimes subintruse). 
The outer involucre bracts have a ciliate margins with spinules; The inner involucre bracts have entire, membranous margins.

Distribution
Gazania maritima is indigenous to the Western Cape Province, South Africa. 
It is recorded from Cape Point (the type locality) on the Cape Peninsula, and from Cape Hangklip.

References

Flora of South Africa
maritima